Terpsithea may refer to the following places in Greece:

Terpsithea, Messenia, part of Kyparissia, Peloponnese
Terpsithea, Glyfada, part of Glyfada, Attica
A neighborhood of Stavroupoli, near Thessaloniki